Nocturna is a fictional supervillainess character appearing in comic books published by DC Comics, created by Doug Moench and Gene Colan. The storyline involving her began in Detective Comics #529 (August 1983), and her first appearance was in Batman #363 (September 1983).

The pre-Crisis incarnation of Nocturna appeared in the first season of the live-action Arrowverse series Batwoman, portrayed by Kayla Ewell.

Fictional character biography

Pre-Crisis
Natalia Knight had a hard childhood. She grew up on the streets as a beggar. She was eventually found and taken in by Charles Knight, who adopted her and provided her with a life of luxury.

She has a passion for astronomy and the night and eventually found a job at Gotham City Observatory. While working there one night, she became victim to a radioactive laser, which drained her skin of all pigment. It also rendered her sensitive to light.

After Charles Knight was murdered, she discovered that her lifestyle was funded by criminal activity. It was then that she met Charles' son, Anton Knight, who fell in love with her. They both decided to keep the inheritance and took it upon themselves to keep them in their accustomed lifestyle through burglary, since Natalia needed expensive medical equipment to treat her hypopigmentation.

Anton, having spent much time in Asia, proved to be a highly capable martial artist. He and Natalia entered a life of crime together, he as the Thief of Night, and she as Nocturna, Mistress of the Night. Their burglary soon brought them into conflict with Batman.

After several clashes with Batman, Anton was captured and sent to prison. Nocturna remained free and continued her life of crime along with a new ally, Nightshade. Nocturna would conceive the plans of robbery and theft, Nightshade and his people would carry out the crimes. Once the scheme had run its course, Nocturna called it quits. During this time, she became an intimate friend of both Bruce Wayne and the Batman, something that made both lives more complicated, especially after they had slept together after Bruce lost custody of Jason. She also became a surrogate mother to Jason Todd, the second Robin, and even adopted him. Not wanting Bruce out of Jason's life she proposed that there was only one sensible solution: she and Bruce must get married at once. Although this seemed to be for his wealth, it is later revealed to be because she is in love with him.

Anton Knight finally escaped and, after being rejected by his beloved Nocturna, changed his style and became the murderous Night-Slayer. He killed Nightshade and traded identities with a delirious Batman. After being betrayed one time too many by Nocturna, Anton vowed to kill her. Before he could do so, Night-Slayer was captured by Catwoman. Nocturna, having been stabbed, was last seen being put into a hot air balloon by Jason Todd.

Post-Crisis
Natalie Metternich (who also used the alias of Natalia Mitternacht) is introduced in Robin (vol. 2) #100. She is a former astronomer that encounters Robin and Spoiler in a storyline that ran through Robin (vol. 2) #101-105.

She first encounters Spoiler after leaving a theater where she had been playing the piano. Her music caused everyone in the theater, including Robin, to cry; with the exception of the Spoiler (who was recovering from a cold). Outside the theater, she is attacked by an unknown man, but rescued by the Spoiler. She refuses to share her name with Stephanie to provide to the police. This causes the Spoiler to become suspicious of her, and eventually the Spoiler and Robin perform a stakeout at the theater where she performs. During her performance, the Spoiler cries but Robin (who has his nose plugged) is unmoved by Natalia's music. The Spoiler later track Natalia to her apartment and helps her save her scientific research papers when it is discovered that her apartment is on fire.

While Natalia stays at the Spoiler's house, Robin and the Spoiler learn that Natalia secretes a pheromone that causes those around her to become emotional and lose their inhibitions. They deduce that the pheromones caused her attacker, a former schizophrenic patient named Dylan Arthur Prescott, to relapse and attack her. When confronted with this information, Natalia denies any knowledge of her powers. She had been an aspiring scientist that eventually quit the scientific field once she contracted her powers, which caused her to lose her inhibitions and pursue other interests (including playing the piano, acquiring a medieval sense of fashion, and other unconventional choices). Robin and the Spoiler convince her to visit S.T.A.R. Labs to have her powers examined.

The Spoiler and Natalia developed a friendship and the Spoiler shared a great amount of personal information with Natalia while her nose was not plugged. When her nose was plugged, she was able to control what she said and how she behaved around Natalia. After the Spoiler contacted Natalia's estranged mother, Natalia fled from her. Robin and the Spoiler eventually found her as she was being confronted by Prescott. After a mental showdown, Prescott flees from Robin and the Spoiler and dies from electrocution on an underground railway. The Spoiler then convinced Natalia to return to S.T.A.R. Labs for further testing; otherwise, she would contact her mother again.

Although she does not assume the Nocturna identity during this storyline, the title the story in Robin (vol. 2) #105 is "Exit Natalia, Enter... Nocturna?". Series writer Jon Lewis, who was reintroducing characters that had encountered various versions of Robin, confirmed that she is a "rebuild of Nocturna".

One Year Later, Nocturna appears in the Black Canary/Green Arrow Wedding Special #1 as a member of the Injustice League. She is next seen in Salvation Run as a member of Vandal Savage's camp, her appearance in this title borrowing from Bruce Timm's unused Batman: The Animated Series concept artwork.

Recently, she appeared in Trinity as an opponent to Hawkman, appearing in an updated version of her classic appearance and using a hot-air balloons as transportation. She then had cameos in the Gotham Gazette: Batman Dead? and Gotham Gazette: Batman Alive? one-shots, where she battles her former friend the Spoiler (who comments that Nocturna has given up on hot air balloons) and uses stealth technology to turn invisible during their fight.

The New 52
In September 2011, The New 52 rebooted DC's continuity. In this new timeline, Nocturna is re-introduced as an inmate of Arkham Asylum during the Night of the Owls storyline. Her true identity here is Natalie Mitternacht. Later in the Forever Evil storyline, Nocturna is among the villains recruited by the Crime Syndicate of America to join the Secret Society of Super Villains.

Nocturna goes on to be the primary antagonist of the Batwoman storylines "Webs" and "The Unknowns", in which she manipulates her way into dating Kate Kane while secretly continuing her life of crime. She hypnotises Kate into believing that she is a vampire, and that her bite has turned Kate into one as well, but Kate is snapped out of it by her sister Beth Kane.

Infinite Frontier 
In DC's Infinite Frontier relaunch, a slightly younger Nocturna (now using the name Natalia Metternich) is made a member of the Suicide Squad alongside Peacemaker, Superboy, Puerto Rican "Culebra", and the William Cobb incarnation of Talon. This version is later revealed to be from an alternate reality.

In other media

Television
 Nocturna was scheduled to appear in an episode of Batman: The Animated Series as a vampire. However, the episode was canceled after Fox censors objected to the storyline, which would have involved Batman being turned into a vampire and craving human blood. Producer Alan Burnett later recounted the events by saying: "We also wanted to do a Nocturna story – Bruce [Timm] had drawn a hot model of her - but she's a vampire, which would've involved bloodletting, which was a huge no-no for kids TV".
 When asked about Nocturna appearing in the series' continuation, The New Batman Adventures, producer and writer Paul Dini stated that they wanted to use her, but the WB Network also said no to vampires.
 The Natalia Knight incarnation of Nocturna appears in the Batwoman episode "Drink Me", portrayed by Kayla Ewell. This version suffers from a unique form of porphyria, which makes her photosensitive. When her adoptive father Charles died of a heart attack two weeks prior, Natalia had to obtain blood on her own - taking on a vampiric persona, getting fang-like dental implants, and utilizing ketamine to stun her targets in order to do so. After attacking Batwoman and Alice, the former eventually defeats Nocturna with her phone's UV light before leaving her for the Crows security agency.

Miscellaneous
Nocturna makes a cameo appearance in issue #12 of The Batman & Scooby-Doo Mysteries. This version's design borrows from Bruce Timm's unused concept for Batman: The Animated Series.

See also
 List of Batman family enemies

References

External links
 
 Nocturna at the DCU Guide

Batman characters
Characters created by Don Newton
Characters created by Doug Moench
Characters created by Gene Colan
Comics characters introduced in 1983
Comics characters introduced in 2002
DC Comics female supervillains
DC Comics LGBT supervillains
Fictional beggars
Fictional bisexual females
Fictional characters with albinism
Fictional professional thieves
Suicide Squad members
Superheroes who are adopted